Robert Catalanotti is a retired major general in the United States Army Reserve. A resident of Grafton, Massachusetts, he last served as the director, Exercises and Training Directorate J-7, United States Central Command (USCENTCOM). He previously served as the Program Manager-Facilities Security Forces, USCENTCOM. From 2007 to 2008, Catalanotti was the Commanding General, 98th Division and the base commander at Camp Taji from December 2004 to October 2005.

Education
Catalanotti is a 1980 graduate of Assumption College who gained his commission as a second lieutenant through cross-town enrollment in Army ROTC at Worcester Polytechnic Institute. He holds a master's degree from Suffolk University and a master's in strategic studies from the United States Army War College.

Awards and decorations

External links

References 

Living people
United States Army generals
Assumption University (Worcester) alumni
People from Grafton, Massachusetts
United States Army personnel of the Iraq War
Recipients of the Legion of Merit
Recipients of the Defense Superior Service Medal
United States Army reservists
Year of birth missing (living people)